Yannima Tommy Watson known as Tommy Watson (born 1930s) was an Indigenous Australian artist, of the Pitjantjatjara people from Australia’s central western desert. He was described by one critic as "the greatest living painter of the Western Desert".

Early life
Tommy Yannima Pikarli Watson was a senior Pitjantjatara elder and law man of the Karima skin group. His given names of Yannima and Pikarli relate to specific sites near Anumarapiti.

Watson's mother died during his infancy, and his father when he was about eight years old. He subsequently went to live with his father's brother, who himself died two years later. Tommy was then adopted by Nicodemus Watson, his father's first cousin. It was at this point that he went to live at Ernabella Mission, and adopted the surname Watson in addition to his Aboriginal birth name, thus becoming Tommy Yannima Pikarli Watson.

Nicodemus Watson became a strong father figure. Together they travelled widely, and Watson learned the traditional skills required to lead a nomadic existence in the desert, including the fashioning of tools and weapons from trees using burning coals, how and what to hunt, and how and where to find water. Under Nicodemus Watson's guidance, Watson learned about nature and his people's ancestral stories, collectively known to the Aboriginal peoples of Australia as Tjukurrpa.
 
Watson's first contact with white Australians was at the Ernabella Mission in South Australia, which opened in 1940. After a short time at Ernabella, he returned to his community to be initiated. Tommy Watson's upbringing is similar to that of many Indigenous people born around the same time, from that point forward living a traditional nomadic existence until his early teens and then working as a stockman and labourer. During his time working at Papunya he met the school teacher Geoffrey Bardon, who was pivotal in supporting the developing Aboriginal art movement at the Papunya Tula art centre.

Art career
Tommy Watson began painting in 2001, and was one of a handful of painters establishing the Irrunytju community art centre in 2001.

Watson's work has received critical acclaim, both within Australia and internationally, with art critics drawing parallels between Watson and Western Abstract painters such as Wassily Kandinsky, Piet Mondrian, Kasimir Malevich, Mark Rothko and Barnett Newman. John MacDonald wrote in the Sydney Morning Herald that Watson "is a master of invention and arguably the outstanding painter of the Western Desert", going on to compare his use of colour to Henri Matisse.

In 2003 Watson was one of eight Indigenous artists, alongside Paddy Bedford, John Mawurndjul, Ningura Napurrula, Lena Nyadbi, Michael Riley, Judy Watson and Gulumbu Yunupingu, who collaborated on a commission to provide works that decorate one of the Musée du quai Branly's four buildings completed in 2006.

In early 2013, Watson moved to live with family in Alice Springs in the Northern Territory. Following an improvement in his health he resumed painting, producing large works up to five meters long. Until the end of his life he was represented commercially by Yanda Aboriginal Art and Piermarq, with large canvases produced at Yanda Aboriginal Art in 2013 selling over $800,000 each. One work, entitled Ngayuku Ngura - Anumara Piti, sold for around $500,000 through Sydney's Piermarq gallery to prominent Sydney businessman Andrew Wise.

In 2014, a major work of 160 x 485 cm by Tommy Watson was exhibited at The European Fine Art Fair (TEFAF), one of the world's most prestigious art fairs. Watson's work was also on display as part of a group exhibition of First Contact Western Desert Masters also featuring Naata Nungurrayi, Esther Giles Nampitjinpa, and George Hairbrush Tjungurrayi at the Piermarq gallery in Sydney in June–July 2014.

In 2014 the Art Series Hotel Group named Watson as the first Indigenous artist to feature in the collection. Located in Adelaide, his namesake hotel The Watson features a collection of high-quality reproduction prints.

Style

Tommy Watson was known for his use of strong vibrant colours, that symbolically represented the ancestral stories of his country. Judith Ryan, Senior Curator of Indigenous Art at the National Gallery of Victoria, has described Watson's colour as "incandescent". Watson's understanding of Australia's physical environment and its relationship with the ancestral stories came to form the central element of his paintings. Watson created his works on premium Belgian linen and favoured Ara Acrylic paint, created by the Gerrit Rietveld Academie. Tommy has been associated with the 'Colour Power' movement that developed within the Indigenous art scene between 1984 and 2004.

Watson himself stated that his art is an exploration of traditional Aboriginal culture, in which the land and spirituality are intertwined and communicated through stories passed on from generation to generation. He said, "I want to paint these stories so that others can learn and understand about our culture and country."

Collections
 Art Gallery of New South Wales
 National Gallery of Australia
 National Gallery of Victoria
 Musee du Quai Branly, Paris
 Art Gallery of Western Australia
 South Australian Art Gallery
 Museum and Art Gallery of the Northern Territory
 Bega Valley Regional Gallery
 Colin Laverty, Collection
 Patrick Corrigan, Collection
 Auscorp Collection
 Kerry Stokes Collection

Artwork

Notes

External links
Example of Tommy Watson's work, National Gallery of Australia
 Wulpa 2004, Art Gallery of NSW
 Walpa 2002, National Gallery of Australia
 Awilyulu 2003, National Gallery of Victoria

Australian Aboriginal artists
Australian painters
2017 deaths
1930s births
People from Goldfields-Esperance
Year of birth uncertain
Australian Aboriginal elders